Edyta Piasecka is a Polish dramatic coloratura soprano.

Biography 
She graduated from the Academy of Music in Kraków.

She made her debut at the Kraków Opera, singing the Queen of the Night in Mozart's The Magic Flute (while still a student). She became a soloist with the Kraków Opera in 1999, when she sang Rosina in Rossini's The Barber of Seville, Nedda in Leoncavallo's Pagliacci, Hanna in Moniuszko's The Haunted Manor, Lucia in Donizetti's Lucia di Lammermoor, Coraline in Adolphe Adam's  Le toréador, Violetta in Verdi's La traviata, Gilda in Verdi's Rigoletto, Fiordiligi in Mozart's Così fan tutte and Rosalinda in J. Strauss's Die Fledermaus. 
She made her debut at the Grand Theatre in Warsaw in 2003 as Contessa di Folleville in the Polish premiere of Rossini's Il viaggio a Reims. Two productions with her were broadcast-ed by Opera Platform: Moniuszko's The Haunted Manor and Żeleński's Goplana (rewarded by International Opera Awards in category "Work rediscovered").

In March 2017 she performed Fiorilla in Rossini's Il turco in Italia directed by Christopher Alden in Warsaw.

She also sang, in concert version, Mimi in Puccini's La bohème and Bellini's Norma.

She performs in many oratorios and symphonic work, such as Verdi's Messa da Requiem; Mozart's Exsultate, jubilate, Coronation Mass, Requiem; Stabat Maters by Pergolesi, Rossini and Szymanowski; Vivaldi's Gloria; Orff's Carmina Burana; Villa-Lobos' Bachianas Brasileiras. She collaborates with Polish and international opera houses and philharmonics, she has performed in music festivals in Poland and abroad.

Outside of Poland, she has sung in Hungary, Belgium, the Netherlands, Germany, the USA, Denmark, Kuwait, and Italy.

Repertoire 

Opera:
 T. Adam, Toreador, Coralina
 V. Bellini, Norma, Norma
 G. Donizetti, Lucia di Lammermoor, Lucia
 R. Leoncavallo, Pagliacci, Nedda
 S. Moniuszko, Halka, Sophia
 S. Moniuszko, The Hanted Manor, Hanna
 W.A. Mozart, Cosi fan tutte, Fiordiriligi
 W.A. Mozart, The Magic Flute, Queen of the Night
 W.A. Mozart, Don Giovanni, Donna Anna
 W.A. Mozart, Le nozze di Figaro, Contessa
 G. Puccini, La boheme, Mimi, Musetta
 G. Rossini, Il barbiere di Siviglia, Rosina
 G. Rossini,  Il viaggio a Reims, Contessa di Folleville
 G. Rossini, Il turco in Italia, Fiorilla
 G. Verdi, Rigoletto, Gilda
 G. Verdi, Traviata, Violetta 
 W. Żeleński, Goplana, Goplana
Operetta:
 J. Strauss, Die Fledermaus, Rosalinda

Oratoria and symphonic works:
 H. M. Górecki, II Symphony "Copernicus"
 W.Kilar, Angelus
 W.Kilar, Te deum
 G. Mahler, II Symfonia c-moll
 W.A. Mozart, Exsultate, jubilate
 W.A. Mozart,  Msza Koronacyjna
 W.A. Mozart, Requiem;
 W.A. Mozart, Grabmusik
 C.Orff , Carmina Burana
 G.B.Pergolesi, Stabat Mater
 G. Rossini, Stabat Mater
 Fr. Schubert, Msza As-dur
 K. Szymanowski, Litania
 K. Szymanowski, Stabat Mater
 A. Vivaldi, Gloria
 G. Verdi, Quatro pezzi sacri
 G. Verdi, Requiem
 H. Villa-Lobos, Bachianas Brasileiras
Songs of Polish composers:
 Fryderyk Chopin;
 Witold Friemann;
 Mieczysław Karłowicz;
 Witold Lutosławski,
 Stanisław Moniuszko;
 Karol Szymanowski;
 Władysław Żeleński.

Bibliography 
 Edyta Piasecka's biography on Polish National Opera (Grand Theatre);
 Edyta Piasecka's biography on portal Opera Musica;
 Edyta Piasecka in Polish Theatre Encyclopedia (PL);
 Information about prizes for Goplana (Work rediscovered) on Operaplatfom

References

External links 
 Official website

Living people
Polish operatic sopranos
21st-century Polish women opera singers
Alumni of the Academy of Music in Kraków
Year of birth missing (living people)
20th-century Polish women opera singers